Nika Gagnidze (born 20 March 2001) is a Georgian footballer who plays as a midfielder for Dila.

Professional career
A youth product of Dila since the age of 16, Gagnidze was promoted to their senior team in 2018 and became a mainstay in the squad. On 15 March 2022, he extended his contract with Dila. On 20 July 2022, Gagnidze transferred to Ümraniyespor as they were newly promoted to the Süper Lig. He made his professional debut with Ümraniyespor in a 1–0 Süper Lig loss to Antalyaspor on 14 August 2022.

International career
Gagnidze is a youth international for Georgia, having played for the Georgia U19s and U21s.

References

External links
 
 Erovnuli Liga profile

2001 births
Living people
People from Gori, Georgia
Footballers from Georgia (country)
Georgia (country) youth international footballers
Georgia (country) under-21 international footballers
FC Dila Gori players
Ümraniyespor footballers
Erovnuli Liga players
Süper Lig players
Association football midfielders
Expatriate sportspeople from Georgia (country) in Turkey
Expatriate footballers in Turkey